Renate Meyer (born 6 January 1938) is a former German sprinter. She competed in sprint events at both the 1964 and 1968 Summer Olympics.

She also won a silver medal in the women's 4 × 100 m relay at the 1966 European Athletics Championships in Budapest.

References

1938 births
Living people
German female sprinters
Olympic athletes of West Germany
Olympic athletes of the United Team of Germany
Athletes (track and field) at the 1964 Summer Olympics
Athletes (track and field) at the 1968 Summer Olympics
Olympic female sprinters
Sportspeople from Hanover